WRNF (89.5 FM) is a radio station licensed to serve Selma, Alabama.  The station is owned by The Moody Bible Institute of Chicago. It airs a Religious radio format.

The station was assigned the WRNF call letters by the Federal Communications Commission on March 16, 2005.

References

External links
WRNF official website

Radio stations established in 2007
Selma, Alabama
Moody Radio
RNF
2007 establishments in Alabama